General James Rodgers Allen (November 17, 1925 – August 11, 1992) was commander in chief of the Military Airlift Command, with headquarters at Scott Air Force Base, Illinois,

He served as a pilot in combat during parts of the Korean War and the Vietnam War, and otherwise was in training, training others, or contributing in planning, administrative or management capacities.

While a planner in the Pentagon, "he was a principal architect of a joint Army-Air Force helicopter raid in 1970 on a camp in North Vietnam, where American prisoners were believed to be held. No prisoners were found."

He was Superintendent of the United States Air Force Academy during 1974–1977, and was its seventh Superintendent in that role.   During his superintendency, the first women cadets started at the academy: on 26 June 1976, 157 women entered, of whom 97 would eventually graduate in 1980.

He was born on November 17, 1925, in Louisville, Kentucky. He entered the U.S. Military Academy in 1944 and was in military service for his full career, retiring on July 1, 1983.  He died of cancer at the hospital of Andrews Air Force Base in Maryland on August 11, 1992. He was buried in Arlington National Cemetery.

Awards and decorations

Personal life
Allen was married to Kathryn A. Allen.  Together, they had a daughter named Katherine Lewis Allen and a son named Jeffrey R. Allen.

Legacy 
The James R. Allen School, now known as Brandenburg Primary School, or JRA, in Brandenburg, Kentucky, was named for him.

References

1925 births
1992 deaths
Superintendents of the United States Air Force Academy
United States Military Academy alumni
United States Air Force personnel of the Korean War
American Korean War pilots
United States Air Force personnel of the Vietnam War
American Vietnam War pilots
Recipients of the Legion of Merit
Recipients of the Distinguished Flying Cross (United States)
Commanders of the Ordre national du Mérite
Recipients of the Silver Star
Recipients of the Order of the Sword (United States)
Burials at Arlington National Cemetery
Recipients of the Defense Distinguished Service Medal
Recipients of the Air Force Distinguished Service Medal
Military personnel from Louisville, Kentucky
20th-century American academics
Recipients of orders, decorations, and medals of Sudan